The Mercer County Courthouse, located on Southeast 3rd Street (Illinois Route 17) in Aledo, is the county courthouse serving Mercer County, Illinois. The courthouse was authorized in 1893 to accommodate the growing county's needs and completed the following year. Architect Mifflin E. Bell designed the Romanesque Revival building; he later expanded upon the same plans to design the DuPage County Courthouse. The three-story sandstone building has arched entrances on all four sides. A clock tower rises above the center of the building, and several dormers project from the sides of the roof.

The courthouse was added to the National Register of Historic Places on June 17, 1982.

References

Courthouses on the National Register of Historic Places in Illinois
County courthouses in Illinois
Romanesque Revival architecture in Illinois
Government buildings completed in 1894
Buildings and structures in Mercer County, Illinois
National Register of Historic Places in Mercer County, Illinois